Shima (written: 嶋 or 島 lit. "island", 志麻 or 志摩) is a Japanese surname. Notable people with the surname include:

, Japanese shogi player
Brian Shima (born 1981), American inline skater
, Japanese actor
George Shima (1864–1926), American businessman
, Japanese engineer
, Japanese ski jumper
, pen name of  Kaoru Kishiue, Japanese writer
, Japanese actress
, Japanese photographer and artist
, Imperial Japanese Navy admiral
, Japanese creative director
, Japanese film director, actor and screenwriter
, Japanese electrical engineer
, Japanese baseball player
, Japanese voice actress
, Japanese artist and photographer
, Japanese samurai
, Japanese painter
, Japanese baseball player and soldier
, Japanese baseball player
, Japanese actor and voice actor
, Japanese footballer
, Japanese samurai
, Japanese women's footballer

Other people
Eugen Shima (born 1992), Albanian footballer
Gerti Shima (born 1986), Albanian basketball player

Fictional characters
, a character in the anime series Sky Girls
Noboru Shima, the human guise of the Tarantula Undead in Kamen Rider Blade
Shima Rin (志摩 リン), a main character in the anime series Yuru Camp

See also
Shima (given name)
Shima (disambiguation)

Japanese-language surnames